Saint-Georges-de-Baroille is a commune in the Loire department in central France.

Population

See also
Communes of the Loire department

References

External links
Official site

Communes of Loire (department)